Bumbu may refer to:

Bumbu, a municipality in the Funa district in the province Kinshasa, the capital city of the Democratic Republic of the Congo 
Tanah Bumbu Regency, a regency in the Indonesian province of South Kalimantan
Bumbu (seasoning), the word for spice or seasoning in Indonesian cuisine
Bumbo, a drink made from rum, water, sugar, and nutmeg, also known as bumbu
Iulian Bumbu, the designer of the Lamborghini Insecta
Ioan Gruia Bumbu, the president of the National Agency for the Roma